Villemort is a commune in the Vienne department in the Nouvelle-Aquitaine region in western France. It is part of the canton of Montmorillon and of the arrondissement of Montmorillon.

See also
Communes of the Vienne department

References

Communes of Vienne